Radiophonie Vol. 9 is an soundtrack album by the French Electronic musician and composer Jean-Michel Jarre to the French news network France Info released on 13 January 2017. The soundtrack was composed during 2016, and titled Hexagone.

Charts

References

Jean-Michel Jarre albums
2017 albums